Hatem Abdul Fatah Saber, formerly known as The Unknown Commander, was an Egyptian Army Colonel, who served as the commander of Unit 777 and the Unit 999 Egypt's most important military units. Previous to this assignment Saber served as the Supervisor of the Egyptian military special unites. Colonel Saber was known as the unknown commander due to his position's secrecy after appearing in military photos wearing a mask. His military career was ended in 2013 after multiple injuries. Currently, he serves as an adviser to the minister of defence, Colonel General Sedki Sobhi. Saber was honored by President Adly Mansour.

Career

Military education

 Bachelor of military science from the Egyptian Military Academy; specialization: Infantry-Sa'ka.
 Sa'ka course.
 Airborne course.
 Frogmen course.
 Counter-International terrorism course.
 Intelligence course.
 Negotiating with terrorists course.
 Securing VIPs course.

Main Command Positions

 Chief of operations, Unit 777.
 Chief of operations, Unit 999.
 Military Intelligence and reconnaissance officer.
 Supervisor, The Egyptian military special unites.
 Martial Arts' Trainer, Special forces of Egypt.

Awards

 Military Duty Decoration, First Class. 
 25 January medal.

References

External links
 
 

1970 births
Living people
Egyptian military officers
Egyptian military personnel